Gruenhagen, Grünhagen is a German surname. Notable people with the surname include:
Glenn Gruenhagen (born 1952), American politician from Minnesota
Kerry Gruenhagen (born c. 1970), American politician from Iowa
Colmar Grünhagen (1828-1911), German archivist and historian

German-language surnames